is a passenger railway station located in the town of Shimanto, Takaoka District, Kōchi, Japan. It is operated by Shikoku Railway Company (JR Shikoku). It has the station number "G29".

Lines
The station is served by JR Shikoku's Yodo Line, and is 10.7 kilometers from the starting point of the line at Wakai Station

Layout
Utsuigawa Station, which is unmanned, is on an embankment and consists of a side platform serving a single track. There is no station building, only a shelter for waiting passengers. A flight of steps leads up from the road to the platform. The station is not wheelchair accessible. A bike shed and toilet are set up at the base of the embankment. Parking is by the side of the road.

Adjacent stations

|-
!colspan=5|JR Shikoku

History
The station opened on 1 March 1974 under the control of Japanese National Railways. After the privatization of JNR on 1 April 1987, control of the station passed to JR Shikoku.

Surrounding area
The Shimanto River runs parallel to the track in the vicinity of the station.
National Route 381 runs parallel to the track on the opposite riverbank.
The Kaiyodo Hobby Museum - a museum with exhibits of anime figurines and models from the Kaiyodo company.

See also
 List of railway stations in Japan

References

External links
Station timetable

Railway stations in Kōchi Prefecture
Yodo Line
Railway stations in Japan opened in 1974
Shimanto, Kōchi (town)